The Angaraes Province is one of seven provinces located in the Huancavelica Region of Peru. The capital of this province is the city of Lircay.

Boundaries
North: Acobamba Province
East: Ayacucho Region
South: Huaytará Province
West: Huancavelica Province

Political division
The province is divided into twelve districts, which are:

 Anchonga (Anchonga)
 Callanmarca (Callanmarca)
 Ccochaccasa (Ccochaccasa)
 Chincho (Chincho)
 Congalla (Congalla)
 Huanca-Huanca (Huanca-Huanca)
 Huayllay Grande (Huayllay Grande)
 Julcamarca (Julcamarca)
 Lircay (Lircay)
 San Antonio de Antaparco (Antaparco)
 Santo Tomás de Pata (Santo Tomás de Pata)
 Secclla (Secclla)

Ethnic groups 
The people in the province are mainly Indigenous citizens of Quechua descent. Quechua is the language which the majority of the population (78.63%) learnt to speak in childhood, 21.12% of the residents started speaking using the Spanish language (2007 Peru Census).

See also 
 Hatun Rit'i
 Kachimayu
 Puka Q'asa
 Qiwllaqucha
 Wayra Q'asa
 Yana Chuku

Sources 

Provinces of the Huancavelica Region